Ranger Peak is in Riverside County, California.

References

Mountains of Riverside County, California
Mountains of Southern California